Bulbulay 2 is a 2019 Pakistani Sitcom which is about an unconventional family. It is a successor to the first Bulbulay. The show airs on ARY Digital in Pakistan, every saturday. The show is produced by Nabeel and written by Saba Hassan. The show was directed by Rana Rizwan before he was replaced by Nabeel. It started airing from 4 June 2019. Its 24th and 23rd episode have the highest and second highest ever ratings of any sitcom.

Plot

Episode 1 (shifting to new house) 
The Bulbulay family shifts to the new house. When Momo and Khoobsurat entered inside the house, there were two strange people who lived in the house. Momo and Khoobsurat thought they were robbers. They told Nabeel and Mehmood Sahab. Nabeel. Mehmood Sahab and Momo then knocked out the strange people. Then a person told them that those two people were knaves who didn't gave the rent of the house. They were very dangerous people.

Episode 3 (saw a ghost) 
In this episode, they saw a ghost while sleeping. They awoke and came running outside. The next day they called a man who would make the ghost go away, but the ghost and the man were acting together. They were robbers. The man first ate food saying he has no power and ate all the food, after which the girl they saw at night came. They screamed and ran into the house. The girl pretended kindness. She said she had prepared some food. They all and were asleep for 1 hour. When they woke up they had nothing; all their things had been stolen.

Cast 
 Nabeel as Nabeel
 Mehmood Aslam as Mehmood Sahab
 Hina Dilpazeer as Mumtaz aka Momo
 Ayesha Omer as Khoobsurat 
 Ashraf Khan as Mustaqeem
 Shagufta Ejaz as Joji Begum
 Faatima Nabeel as Chandi (Nabeel and Khoobsurat's daughter)
 Nyle Rizwan as Sona (Mehmood and Mumtaz's son)

Recurring 
 Tariq Butt as Butt Sahab
 Ayaaz Khan as Sher Khan
 Shahid Khwaja as Dr
 Fahmeed Baig as Baig Sahab
 Khalid Anam as Siddiqui; Khoobsurat's father after having surgery as he had a terrible accident
 Namrah Shahid as Nirali; Siddiqui's third wife, actually a wanted criminal who scams Nabeel and Mehmood to marry her to Siddiqui
 Fasih as Raja; servant at Siddiqui Sahab house
 Farhad Riaz as Pappu; peon at Bulbulay Match makers and Wedding planners (Episode 81-84)
 Sofia as Yasmeen; receptionist at Bulbulay Match makers and Wedding planners (Episode 81-84)
 Ashraf Khan as Aatish/Abba G; Mumtaz's father
 Hina Dilpazeer as Kokab; step sister of Mumtaz (Episode 37)
 Shehnaz Pervaiz as Jamila 
 Bahadur Sheikh in various roles
 Faizan Shahzad Khan as Faizi Sun
 Hina Rizvi as Shumaila (Khoobsurat's aunt) 
 Fareeda Shabbir as Afreen
 Arifa Siddiqui as Ghalib
 Mubeen Gabol as Various voice
 Waheed Khan as Various voice 
 Mustafa Chaudhry as various voice
 Shafaat Ali as various voice 
 Aijaz Aslam

Episodic appearance 
 Aamir Qureshi as Kaali Bhai; former and dangerous tenant in the new house of Bulbulay family (Episode 1)
 Kausar Siddiqui as Haseena; wife of Kaali who's a convicted murderer (Episode 1)
 Sonia Rao as Gul Bakht; Sher Khan's wife and wants to marry Nabeel (Episode 2)
 Nausheen Ahmed as Khoobsurat Jr; a gang member pretended to be Khoobsurat to rob Bulbulay family (Episode 5)
 Akber Khan as Palmist; a fraudster who predicts that Nabeel is gonna murder Mehmood (Episode 6)
 Maham Amir as Qamroosh; new neighbor in the vicinity and Mehmood wants to marry her but turns out that she's already married (Episode 8)
 Maira Khan as Sweety; jinn having dispute with his husband as she wants to marry a human being (Episode 9) 
 Saqib Sumeer as Ugly; jinn and husband of Sweety (Episode 9)
 Nighat Sultana as Khushi; a wealthy cancer patient and her wish is to get married before her death (Episode 10) 
 Urooj Abbas as Badaruddin; owner of new house of Bulbulay family (Episode 12)
 Rehana Kaleem as Khushnuma; first wife of Badaruddin (Episode 12)
 Khwaja Saleem as Barood Khan; security guard hired by Javed Sahab (Episode 13)
 Agha Shiraz as Pappi Bhai; a thug involved in black money earning (Episode 17)
 Irfan Motiwala as Bunty; director wanted to do a cooking show featuring Khoobsurat (Episode 18)
 Darakshan Tahir as Begum; genie who wants to marry Mehmood  (Episode 19)
 Akber Khan as Baba Ting Tong; sorcerer called by Nabeel to control Begum (Episode 19)
 Naveed Raza as Hakeem Rafeeq; fake dermatologist, formed business partnership with Bulbulay housemates (Episode 20)
 Bashar Amir Shafi as Tiger; an orphan and pickpocket adopted by Nabeel to help him earn money (Episode 21)
 Ali Raza as Spiderman; wanted smuggler impersonated as Spiderman who takes shelter in Bulbulay house (Episode 22)
 Unknown as Jin Jang; Chinese language teacher (Episode 23)
 Nausheen Ahmed as Anarkali; love interest of Mehmood and Nabeel in the dream of Nabeel (Episode 24)
 Urooj Abbas as Naseem Vicky; Mehmood's childhood friend (Episode 28)
 Akber Khan as Baba Billo; an effeminate sorcerer (Episode 28)
 Saqib Sumeer as Boss; a thief (Episode 29)
 Khwaja Saleem as Barood Khan; security guard hired by Javed Sahab (Episode 30)
 Aamir Qureshi as Kafoor; genie who wants to marry Khoobsurat (Episode 31 and 75)
 Unknown as Bibi Sifli; a witch hired to capture Kafoor (Episode 31)
 Waseem Dhamia as Feeka Faraar; a wadera who want his son Teeka to have tution at Bulbulay house (Episode 32)
 Tabrez Shah as Teeka; Feeka's son having tutions at Bulbulay house (Episode 32)
 Irfan Motiwala as Fuse; electrician came to solve electricity issues in Bulbulay house (Episode 33)
 Asad Mehmood as Sunny; Javed Sahab's son (Episode 33)
 Naveed Raza as Inaam; income tax officer recovering tax from Bulbulay family (Episode 34)
 Maham Aamir as Aarzoo; a spirit who committed suicide due to  infidelity (Episode 36)
 Shafaat Ali as Tony; a host of a haunted show (Episode 38)
 Ayaz Ahmed as Aashiq; a travel agent assisting Bulbulay family to go Germany (Episode 39)
 Humaira Zahid as Basharat aka Baby Aunty; Khoobsurat's Aunty (Episode 40)
 Ali Raza as Joker; mental asylum inmate taking shelter at Bulbulay house (Episode 41)
 Naveed Raza as Batman; mental asylum inmate taking shelter at Bulbulay house (Episode 41)
 Sonia Rao as Teacher; Sona and Chandi teacher (Episode 42)
 Akber Khan as Baba; a fraud sorcerer (Episode 43)
 Mehboob Sultan as Chaudhry Sahab; politician competing with Mehmood in an election (episode 44)
 Bashar Aamir Shafi as Makoota; son of Zakoota jinn (Episode 45)
 Kausar Siddiqui as Talat; neighbour of Bulbulay family who's involved in drugs business (Episode 46)
 Arif Siddiqui as Jaanu; alcoholic friend of Mehmood invited by him as he was mentally unstable (Episode 49)
 Shehnaz Pervaiz as Nusrat; Khoobsurat's phuppo (Episode 50)
 Akber Khan as Shaukat; Nusrat's husband (Episode 50)
 Ali Raza as Nomi; Nabeel's friend who came to have wedding at Bulbulay house (Episode 54) 
 Bisha as Kiran; Nomi's fiance who runs away from her home to marry Nomi(Episode 54)
 Fazal Balti as Don; Kiran's brother who doesn't want Kiran to marry Nomi(Episode 54)
 Mehboob Sultan as Badshah; a dacoit who has hidden his looted goods under the mansion of Bulbulay family (Episode 55)
 Irfan Motiwala as Feekay; a dacoit helping Badshah in finding looted goods (Episode 55)
 Maham Aamir as Sania; a psychotic widow who married Nabeel in his dream (Episode 56)
 Agha Shiraz as Gogi Bhai; leader of a local dacoit group (Episode 57)
 Ali Raza as Changu; member of dacoit group of Gogi Bhai (Episode 57)
 Nasir Sharif as Mangu; member of dacoit group of Gogi Bhai (Episode 57)
 Namrah Shahid as Mehru; Abba G's fiance who's actually a robber (Episode 59)
 Farhad Riaz as Sameer; Mehru's partner in robbery (Episode 59)
 Akber Khan as Baba G; a spiritual astrologer (Episode 60)
 Ali Syed as thief; a local thief on the run (Episode 60)
 Mehboob Sultan as Rafiq Ahmed; don wants to take revenge from Mehmood for beating his son (Episode 62)
 Syed Fazal Hussain as Tiger; son of Don (Episode 62)
 Nasir Sharif as Jaanu; Nabeel's friend (Episode 64)
 Ismail Tara as Jaan; Jaan's father (Episode 64)
 Sonia Rao as Dolly; new gold-digger neighbor shifted in the vicinity of Bulbulay house (Episode 66)
 Sobia Dedhi as Soni; niece of Dolly (Episode 66)
 Urooj Abbas as Boss; interviewee at company (Episode 67)
 Arif Siddiqui as Meter Baba; a sorcerer who claims to reduce the amount of electricity consumption by electric meter(Episode 68)
 Saqib Sumeer as Joji Jasoos; a fraudster claims to be detective for the investigation of Noshi's murder (Episode 69)
 Bisha as Nosheen aka Noshi; Joji's partner in fraud (Episode 69)
 Urooj Abbas as Siddiqui; a man hired by Nabeel and Mehmood to claim that he's real Siddiqui Sahab (Episode 71)
 Arif Siddiqui as Mangu; milkman to whom Bulbulay family owes money (Episode 74)
 Fazal Balti as Changu; washerman to whom Bulbulay family owes money (Episode 74)
 Zareen Khan as Chatori; Kafoor Jinn's wife (Episode 75)
  Yusra Khan as Pyaari; personal maid of Khoobsurat (Episode 76)
 Alina Khan as Dulari; personal maid of Momo (Episode 76)
 Mehboob Sultan as Pappu; a robber at the beach (Episode 77)
 Naveed Raza as Latto; partner of Pappu (Episode 77)
 Nisha as Rim Jhim; Nabeel's love interest (Episode 79)
 Farhad Riaz as Jaanu Cable Wala; television cable operator (Episode 80)
 Ali Raza as Bunty; client at Bulbulay Match makers and Wedding planners belongs to a Punjabi traditional family (Episode 81)
 Fareena Ejaz as Sonia; Bunty's fiance belongs to modern family (Episode 81)
 Shehnaz Pervaiz as Parveen; Bunty's mother (Episode 81)
 Humaira Zahid as Seema; Sonia's mother (Episode 81)
 Dodi Khan as Don; goon who loves Maria and kidnaps her to marry (Episode 82)
 Bakhtawar Aamir as Maria; an innocent girl kidnapped by Don to marry (Episode 82)
 Asad Javed as TT; Don's right hand (Episode 82)
 Amir Qureshi as Shakir; a fraudster who claims to be Sheikh of Yemen and came to Bulbulay wedding planners for marriage (Episode 83)
 Hiba Zoya as Shehzadi; bride to be of Shakir (Episode 83)
 Gul-e-Rana as Nafeesa; an old lady wants to marry (Episode 84)
 Urooj Abbas as Rasheed; a marriage proposal for Nafeesa (Episode 84)
 Akber Khan as Saleem; a poet who brings marriage proposal for Nafeesa (Episode 84)
 Maham Amir as Heer; client at Bulbulay wedding planner (Episode 85)
 Zuhab Khan as Maharaj 
 Mehboob Sultan as himself
 Hina Rizvi as Nahi Munni

Release 
After a gap of two years, in Ramazan, Bulbulay started to air on BOL Entertainment by the title "Phir Bulbulay". It was renamed to "Bolbulay". ARY Digital went to court against BOL Entertainment. BOL Entertainment lost the case so they stopped airing Bulbulay.

References 

Pakistani television series
Urdu-language television shows
ARY Digital original programming
2019 Pakistani television series debuts